John Young Hilley Walker (17 December 1928 – 23 January 2019) was a Scottish footballer who played as an inside forward in the Football League for Wolverhampton Wanderers, Southampton and Reading.

Career
Walker began his professional career when he joined Football League First Division side Wolverhampton Wanderers in 1947. He had to wait until 18 February 1950 to make his senior debut, when he played in a 1–0 win against Portsmouth, the first of twelve appearances during this season, which yielded eight goals.

The forward scored eleven times during the 1950–51 campaign, but found himself out of favour with manager Stan Cullis as time progressed, and by the next season he made only five appearances. Despite his record of 26 goals in 44 games, Walker was allowed to leave Molineux in October 1952 to join Southampton for £12,000.

He continued to score goals for his new club, netting 52 in total for the Saints during a six-season stay before he departed to join Reading in December 1957 for a £2,500 fee. He played for the Royals in the Third Division until retiring from playing in 1964.

Walker later also served Reading as their reserve team coach before leaving football in 1979 to work for the Royal Mail.

His death was reported on 24 January 2019.

References

Bibliography

External links

1928 births
2019 deaths
Footballers from Glasgow
Scottish footballers
Wolverhampton Wanderers F.C. players
Southampton F.C. players
Reading F.C. players
English Football League players
Association football inside forwards